The 1816 Armagh City by-election was held on 8 May 1816 following the death of Patrick Duigenan. The Tories held the seat electing Daniel Webb Webber to serve the Armagh City constituency which he did until the 1818 general election.

References

1810s elections in Ireland
1810s elections in the United Kingdom
1816 in Ireland
19th century in County Armagh
May 1816 events
By-elections to the Parliament of the United Kingdom in County Armagh constituencies
Unopposed by-elections to the Parliament of the United Kingdom in Irish constituencies